Thaumatotibia is a genus of moths belonging to the family Tortricidae.

Some species have been moved here from other genera, such as Cryptophlebia or Eucosma.

Species
Thaumatotibia aclyta (Turner, 1916)
Thaumatotibia agriochlora (Meyrick, 1929)
Thaumatotibia apicinudana (Mabille, 1900)
Thaumatotibia batrachopa (Meyrick, 1908)
Thaumatotibia chaomorpha (Meyrick, 1929)
Thaumatotibia citrogramma (Clarke, 1976)
Thaumatotibia dolichogonia (Diakonoff, 1988)
Thaumatotibia ecnomia (Diakonoff, 1974)
Thaumatotibia encarpa (Meyrick, 1920)
Thaumatotibia etiennei (Diakonoff, 1974)
Thaumatotibia eutacta (Diakonoff, 1988)
Thaumatotibia fulturana (Kuznetzov, 1992)
Thaumatotibia hemitoma (Diakonoff, 1976)
Thaumatotibia leucotreta (Meyrick, 1913)
Thaumatotibia macrogona (Diakonoff, 1988)
Thaumatotibia macrops (Diakonoff, 1959)
Thaumatotibia nannophthalma (Diakonoff, 1976)
Thaumatotibia nythobia (Clarke, 1971)
Thaumatotibia rassembi 
Thaumatotibia rochata 
Thaumatotibia zophophanes (Turner, 1946)

See also
List of Tortricidae genera

References

External links
tortricidae.com

Grapholitini
Tortricidae genera